Lakshmi Nagar is a neighborhood in the city of Erode in Tamil Nadu. It is located near the famous religious pilgrimage place Bhavani in Erode. It is situated in the banks of rivers Cauvery and Bhavani. Distance from Central Bus Terminus, Erode is 11km.

Neighbourhoods in Erode